Nebria labontei is a species of ground beetle from Nebriinae subfamily that is endemic to US state of Oregon.

References

labontei
Beetles described in 1984
Beetles of North America
Endemic fauna of Oregon